Frickley Athletic Football Club is a football club based in South Elmsall, West Yorkshire, England.

History
Although the club itself claims it was formed in 1910, the team was active as early as 1908 when it was a member of the South Yorkshire League. The football team was only one arm of the Frickley Athletic Club, which had been formed to give miners at the Frickley Colliery a recreational outlet. In a 1908 Yorkshire Telegraph and Star newspaper article the club was referred to as Frickley Colliery Athletic, but as the years went by the Athletic suffix was used less often.

In 1910, after joining the Sheffield Association League, they entered the FA Cup for the first time, their first game ending in a 0–3 defeat to Rotherham based Atlas Hotel. Frickley returned to the South Yorkshire League for the duration of the First World War, but rejoined the Association League in 1919, and in 1921 they were crowned league champions, pipping Eckington Works to the title. Although they lost the title to Gainsborough Trinity reserves a year later, they did reach the 4th Qualifying Round of the FA Cup for the first time, and in the summer of 1922 they were accepted as new members of the Yorkshire League.

Colliery soon established themselves as one of the league's top sides, finishing in third place in their inaugural campaign in the competition, and going one step further to finish as runners-up a year later. In 1924 they applied to become members of the Midland League, and they were gladly admitted by a competition that had lost a lot of its members the previous year.

The club found the going tough in the Midland League, and for many years struggled against finishing in the lower reaches of the competition – in 1931 they conceded 137 goals and unsurprisingly finished bottom of the league. By 1933, gate receipts had dwindled and they withdrew from league football for a year. They returned in 1934, but were still often found propping up the league table. In 1936–37 they again finished bottom of the pile, but the season had provided a highlight when Frickley reached the 1st round proper of  the FA Cup for the first time ever – although they lost 0–2 to Football League side Southport at Westfield Lane, a bumper crowd gave the club coffers a much needed boost.

Frickley returned to play in the Sheffield Association League for the duration of the Second World War, but rejoined the Midland League in 1945. Their second appearance in the FA Cup proper came in the 1957–58 season, when they were knocked out by South Shields away from home.

In 1960 the Midland League disbanded, and Frickley, having finished bottom of the table, opted to join the Cheshire League, a competition they remained in for the duration of the 1960s, despite the Midland League having been restarted only a year after folding. Colliery were far more competitive in the Cheshire League, although they never troubled the top places in the division. In 1963 they beat Macclesfield Town away in the Fourth Qualifying Round of the FA Cup to set up a mouth-watering First Round tie at Meadow Lane against Notts County, the Third Division only just progressing after beating Frickley 2–1. In 1969 the club entered the FA Trophy for the first time.

In 1970 Colliery returned to the Midland League, which had lost a lot of its members to the recently formed Northern Premier League. Frickley soon became one of the more accomplished sides in the league, with third and second-placed finishes (in 1971 and 1973 respectively) sandwiching another trip to the First Round of the FA Cup. Rotherham United journeyed to Westfield Lane and had to settle for a 2–2 draw in a thrilling encounter before seeing off the non-league side in the replay at Millmoor. Two years later the Blues faced another Yorkshire derby in the FA Cup proper, but the encounter was less memorable for Frickley, who were trounced 1–6 at The Shay.

In 1976, two years after changing their name to Frickley Athletic, the club was admitted to the Northern Premier League. At first they became whipping boys, finishing fourth bottom in the inaugural campaign, but they soon turned the tide, and in 1980 finished in third place. The club committee took the decision to apply for membership of the recently founded Alliance Premier League (APL), the highest level below the Football League, and were rewarded with a place in the competition for the 1980–81 season.

Any fears that Frickley would find the APL too tough were soon allayed, and the club was to embark on a golden era. The club reached the FA Cup proper in four successive years from 1983, reaching the second round in 1984 (losing to Darlington at Feethams) and going one better a year later. After beating Hartlepool United away in the second round (their first ever win over Football League opposition), Frickley got the home draw they wanted in the third round, with local rivals Rotherham United the visitors to Westfield Lane. The Millers came away with the spoils, winning 3–1 in front of a ground record crowd of 5,800, but Frickley's season would only get better – they would come within a whisker of taking the APL title, with only Enfield able to finish above them in the league table and take the championship.

The APL was renamed the Football Conference for the following season, and Frickley's golden era had come to an end. They finished second bottom of the division and were relegated back to the Northern Premier League (NPL) Premier Division. They have remained in the NPL Premier Division since 1987, only once looking like winning promotion again in 2006, when they finished as league runners-up but were beaten in the end of season play-offs. On more than one occasion Frickley have finished in the bottom three but have been reprieved from relegation. In 2022, the club was relegated to the ninth tier of English football for the first time in the club's history.

Frickley's last appearance in the FA Cup proper was in 2000, when they were beaten 4–0 by Northampton Town at Sixfields Stadium.

Season-by-season record

Ground
Since 1910 Frickley have played home games at Westfield Lane. The ground was initially used for athletics as early as 1904, with the main stand being approved for construction in 1927 and opened in 1929, with the help of the miners welfare fund. While the colliery was still operating the stadium sat at the foot of a tall spoil tip, which has since been largely lowered in height and landscaped as part of Frickley Country Park.

Honours
Sheffield and Hallamshire Senior Cup
Winners 1927/28, 1956/57, 1960/61, 1962/63, 1966/67, 1978/79, 1985/86, 1987/88, 1989/90, 1999/00, 2003/04, 2012/13, 2014/15, 2015/16
Midland League Cup
Winners 1975–76

Records
Best League performance: 2nd, Alliance Premier League, 1985–86
Best FA Cup performance: Third round, 1985–86
Best FA Trophy performance: Quarter-finals, 1984–85
Record attendance: 5,800 vs. Rotherham United, FA Cup Third round, 1985–86

Players

Current squad

Club personnel

Management team

{|class="wikitable"
|-
!Position
!Staff
|-
|Manager|| Patrick McGuire
|-
|Assistant manager|| Blake Campbell
|-
|U23s manager|| Martin Beaumont
|-
|U23s assistant manager|| Tony Jones
|-
|U23s physio|| Bob Smith

Club officials

{|class="wikitable"
|-
!Position
!Staff
|-
|Chairman|| Richard Norman
|-
|rowspan="4"|Directors|| Phil McCroakam
|-
| Mark Ainge
|-
| Barry Johnson
|-
| Penny Wall
|-
|Treasurer|| Phil McCroakam
|-
|Inclusion and Diversity Officer|| Chris Medwell
|-

See also
Frickley Athletic F.C. players

References

External links

Official website

 
Sport in the City of Wakefield
Association football clubs established in 1910
Football clubs in England
Northern Premier League clubs
National League (English football) clubs
Football clubs in West Yorkshire
1910 establishments in England
Yorkshire Football League
Sheffield & Hallamshire County FA members
Mining association football teams in England
Cheshire County League clubs